The Light of the Western Stars is a lost 1918 American silent Western film starring Dustin Farnum and Winifred Kingston. Charles Swickard directed.

Plot
As described in a film magazine, discontented cow puncher Gene Stewart (Farnum) makes a bet that he will marry the next woman who comes to town. Majesty Hammond (Kingston), the sister of a successful ranch owner, arrives that night and Gene in a drunken revel threatens old Padre Marcos (Swickard) with death unless he marries them. He completely cows the young woman into submission and, when he finds out who she is, he sheepishly takes her to the house of her brother's fiance, and then leaves after apologizing for frightening her. She buys the ranch of a Mexican desperado and needs Gene to run it for her, but he has gone with a gang of Mexicans and is too drunk to be appealed to by anyone but Majesty. She finally persuades him to return. He has advised Bonita (Boardman) to take refuge in the crags when she is about to be accused of the murder of a man who fought for her. Majesty does not understand the relationship between Gene and Bonita. When the desperado Don Carlos attacks the ranch, Gene saves Majesty from the Mexicans. Majesty sees Gene talking to Bonita and becomes jealous. Gene is taken captive by Don Carlos and is condemned to death. When Majesty decides to return to the east, the old priest reproaches her for her behavior. Filled with regret over her feelings, Majesty gets a reprieve for Gene and a warrant for Carlos, and saves Gene from death just in time.

Cast
 Dustin Farnum as Gene Stewart
 Winifred Kingston as Majesty Hammond
 Bert Appling as Sheriff Hawes
 Josef Swickard as Padre Marcos
 Virginia True Boardman as Bonita
 Charley Rogers as Danny Marns (billed as Charles Rogers)
 Jeanne Maddock as Florence Kingsley
 George Field as Don Carlos (billed as George Fields)
 Frank Clark as Bill Stillwell
 Edward Hearn as Al Hammond (billed as Eddie Hearn)
 Ogden Crane as Nels
 Lon Poff as Monta Price
 George Cummings as Nick Steele
 Sam Appel as Gomez
 Frank Campeau (Undetermined Role)

See also
 The Light of Western Stars (1925)
 The Light of Western Stars (1930)
 The Light of Western Stars (1940)

References

External links
 
 
 Grey, Zane (1914), The Light of Western Stars, a Romance, New York: Grosset & Dunlap, on the Internet Archive

1918 films
1918 Western (genre) films
Lost Western (genre) films
Films based on American novels
Films based on Western (genre) novels
Films based on works by Zane Grey
American black-and-white films
Films directed by Charles Swickard
Lost American films
1918 lost films
Silent American Western (genre) films
1910s American films
1910s English-language films